Mike Edmonds is an American academic administrator, and former acting co-president of Colorado College, alongside former acting co-president Robert Moore and succeeding Jill M. Tiefenthaler. He served as co-president from July 2020 until July 1, 2021 at which point he became the Vice President and Chief of Staff to Song Richardson.

Early life and education 
Originally from Clarksville, Tennessee, Edmonds attended the University of Mississippi in Oxford, Mississippi, where he earned two bachelor's degrees in theater arts and speech communication, as well as a master's degree and PhD in higher education.

Career 
In 1991, Edmonds was hired by Colorado College to be dean of students, and in 2005 was promoted to also be the vice president for student life. In July 2020, along with Colorado College senior vice president for finance and administration, Robert Moore, Edmonds was appointed as the acting co-president, and the first black president in the college’s history. He served in this role until July 2021 at which point he became the Vice President and Chief of Staff to Colorado College's 14th President Song Richardson. He currently serves in this role.

Awards 
Edmonds is a University of Mississippi Hall of Fame graduate.

In 2012, the Barkley Forum at Emory University awarded him with a Gold Key award.

In 2019, he was inducted into the University of Mississippi School of Education Hall of Fame, as well as the National Speech and Debate Association Hall of Fame.

References 

Presidents of Colorado College
Year of birth missing (living people)
Living people